Alexis Kay'ree Hornbuckle (born October 16, 1985) is an American professional basketball player who played several seasons in the Women's National Basketball Association. She is the only player to win an NCAA title and WNBA title in the same year (2008 - with the University of Tennessee and the Detroit Shock).

High school years
Born in Charleston, West Virginia, Hornbuckle attended Capital High School and later graduated from South Charleston High School Alexis was a high school teammate of Renee Montgomery (who currently plays for the Atlanta Dream). In addition to playing basketball, she also competed in her high school's female soccer team. Hornbuckle was named a WBCA All-American. She participated in the 2004 WBCA High School All-America Game, where she scored eight points, and earned MVP honors.

College years
Hornbuckle played four years for the University of Tennessee's Women's basketball team, graduating in 2008 with Candace Parker, Shannon Bobbitt, and Nicky Anosike. She was a key player for two NCAA Championship teams during her tenure, earning places on the 2007 All-SEC First Team, 2007 SEC All-Tournament Team and 2005 All-SEC Freshmen Team. She currently holds the mark for most career steals by a Tennessee Women's player.

Hornbuckle played for the USA team in the 2007 Pan American Games in Rio de Janeiro, Brazil. The team won all five games, earning the gold medal for the event.

In the 2008 WNBA Draft, Hornbuckle was selected by the Detroit Shock in the first round (fourth overall).

Tennessee statistics
Source

WNBA

Hornbuckle was drafted 4th overall by the Detroit Shock in 2008. In her first WNBA game, she set a franchise record with seven steals while playing just 19 minutes. She averaged 5.4 points per game during the Shock's run to the 2008 WNBA title.

Hornbuckle became a starter in 2009, and moved with the franchise to Tulsa in 2010. She was traded to the Minnesota Lynx halfway through the season, where she served as a backup to starting point guard Lindsay Whalen. She was acquired by the Phoenix Mercury on February 2, 2012 and played for them for the 2012 and 2013 seasons.

WNBA career statistics

Regular season

|-
|style="text-align:left;background:#afe6ba;"|  2008†
| align="left" | Detroit
| 34 || 0 || 22.0 || .354 || .356 || .636 || 4.1 || 2.1 || 2.3 || 0.3 || 1.4 || 5.4
|-
| align="left" | 2009
| align="left" | Detroit
| 32 || 21 || 26.6 || .380 || .391 || .542 || 4.9 || 2.7 || 1.3 || 0.3 || 2.2 || 6.7
|-
| align="left" | 2010
| align="left" | Tulsa
| 15 || 10 || 21.1 || .373 || .400 || .833 || 3.5 || 2.7 || 1.5 || 0.7 || 1.8 || 5.8
|-
| align="left" | 2010
| align="left" | Minnesota
| 13 || 0 || 14.9 || .283 || .167 || .750 || 1.5 || 1.3 || 1.4 || 0.2 || 0.9 || 3.0
|-
|style="text-align:left;background:#afe6ba;"|  2011†
| align="left" | Minnesota
| 29 || 0 || 7.2 || .375 || .294 || .500 || 1.1 || 0.6 || 0.3 || 0.1 || 0.7 || 1.1
|-
| align="left" | 2012
| align="left" | Phoenix
| 34 || 25 || 25.4 || .335 || .325 || .605 || 4.2 || 2.0 || 1.2 || 0.5 || 2.1 || 6.5
|-
| align="left" | 2013
| align="left" | Phoenix
| 30 || 1 || 12.4 || .326 || .278 || .700 || 1.7 || 1.3 || 0.4 || 0.1 || 1.3 || 3.0
|-
| align="left" | Career
| align="left" | 6 years, 3 teams
| 187 || 57 || 19.0 || .351 || .330 || .639 || 3.2 || 1.8 || 1.2 || 0.3 || 1.5 || 4.6

Playoffs

|-
|style="text-align:left;background:#afe6ba;"|  2008†
| align="left" | Detroit
| 9 || 0 || 24.4 || .429 || .375 || .750 || 4.9 || 2.1 || 1.2 || 0.8 || 1.3 || 6.3
|-
| align="left" | 2009
| align="left" | Detroit
| 5 || 5 || 35.4 || .489 || .333 || 1.000 || 6.0 || 4.0 || 1.8 || 0.6 || 3.2 || 10.6
|-
|style="text-align:left;background:#afe6ba;"|  2011†
| align="left" | Minnesota
| 4 || 0 || 3.8 || .600 || .000 || 1.000 || 1.3 || 1.3 || 0.0 || 0.5 || 0.3 || 2.8
|-
| align="left" | 2013
| align="left" | Phoenix
| 4 || 0 || 10.8 || .300 || .000 || 1.000 || 2.3 || 1.5 || 1.0 || 0.5 || 1.3 || 2.0
|-
| align="left" | Career
| align="left" | 4 years, 3 teams
| 22 || 5 || 20.7 || .451 || .300 || .848 || 4.0 || 2.3 || 1.1 || 0.6 || 1.5 || 5.9

Overseas career
She played for Besiktas in Turkey during the 2008–09 WNBA off-season, for PeKa (Finland) and Elitzur Holon (Israel) in 2009-10,  for Ramat Hasharon (Israel) and Tarsus (turkey) in 2010-11, and Elitzur Holon (Israel) in the 2012-2013 off-season.

After Basketball
Alexis is currently a Certified Personal Trainer at Alexis Hornbuckle Basketball. She is also podcast host of The Collective Unfiltered and Buck & 2MC Lady Vol Show on the Volunteer Roadshow. She has interviewed many athletes and influencers such as former Tennessee Lady Vol basketball players Chamique Holdsclaw and Brittany Jackson. She has hosted other podcasts on the Volunteer Roadshow with former University of Tennessee football star player Billy Ratliff and former University of Tennessee men's basketball and NBA star player Jarnell Stokes.

See also
 2008 WNBA Draft

Notes

External links
 

Alexis Hornbuckle: Heart of a Champion

1985 births
Living people
American expatriate basketball people in Finland
American expatriate basketball people in Israel
American expatriate basketball people in Turkey
American women's basketball players
Basketball players at the 2007 Pan American Games
Basketball players from West Virginia
Beşiktaş women's basketball players
Detroit Shock players
Minnesota Lynx players
Pan American Games gold medalists for the United States
Pan American Games medalists in basketball
Parade High School All-Americans (girls' basketball)
People from South Charleston, West Virginia
Point guards
Shooting guards
South Charleston High School alumni
Sportspeople from Charleston, West Virginia
Tennessee Lady Volunteers basketball players
Tulsa Shock players
Medalists at the 2007 Pan American Games
21st-century American women
United States women's national basketball team players